Rosanne Wong (黃婉君, Wong Yuen-Guan, b. 30 June 1979) is the member of a former Hong Kong cantopop music duo group 2R alongside younger sister Race Wong.

Background
She was born in Malaysia and moved to Singapore with her family at a very young age. Her younger sisters are Race Wong and Rhonda Wong. She was discovered by an agent while performing in a singing contest.

Discography
See Discography of 2R

Filmography
Hearts Of Fencing (2003) (TVB)
Sound of Colors (2003)
Love is a Many Stupid Thing (2004)
Ab-normal Beauty (2004)
China's Next Top Princess (2005)

1979 births
Living people
Cantopop singers
Cantonese-language singers
Hong Kong film actresses
21st-century Hong Kong women singers
TVB actors
Singaporean people of Cantonese descent
21st-century Singaporean women singers
Singaporean actresses
Malaysian emigrants to Singapore
Malaysian born Hong Kong artists